Matías Russo (born September 4, 1985) Paraná Entre Ríos, is an Argentine racing driver.
He has run in different series, with major success in FIA GT Championship.

Russo won the GT2 class of the 2008 FIA GT San Luis 2 Hours with team-mate Luís Pérez Companc on the Ferrari F430.

24 Hours of Le Mans results

References

External links
 http://www.fiagt.com/driverinfo.php?drivername=Matías%20Russo

1985 births
Living people
Argentine racing drivers
Formula 3 Sudamericana drivers
Formula Renault Argentina drivers
FIA GT Championship drivers
Auto GP drivers
Top Race V6 drivers
TC 2000 Championship drivers
American Le Mans Series drivers
European Le Mans Series drivers
24 Hours of Le Mans drivers
Blancpain Endurance Series drivers
24 Hours of Spa drivers
International GT Open drivers
Súper TC 2000 drivers
Audi Sport drivers
AF Corse drivers